is a former Japanese football player and manager. He is the current manager of Fagiano Okayama.

Playing career
Kiyama was born in Itami on February 18, 1972. After graduating from University of Tsukuba, he joined Gamba Osaka in 1994. He played many matches as center back from first season. However his opportunity to play decreased for injuries from 1995. In 1998, he moved to Consadole Sapporo and played in 1 season. In May 1999, he joined Japan Football League club Mito HollyHock. He became a regular player as center back and the club was promoted to J2 League from 2000. He played as central player of defense until 2002. He retired end of 2002 season.

Coaching career
After coaching for University of Tsukuba and then the youth team of Vissel Kobe, he took his first top team coaching position for his former club Mito HollyHock in 2008. He has the record for the youngest person to coach a J2 League club at 36 years and 19 days, and was the first J2 League coach to be sent off in his debut match. He is also the first professional sports coach in Japan to go public about his decision to quit smoking.

Kiyama was the manager for J2 side JEF United Chiba at 2012 season, but after JEF failed to get the promotion to J1, he was released from the team on November 28, 2012, but he continued managing the club until their defeat to Kashima Antlers on 2012 Emperor's Cup at the quarterfinals.

Kiyama returned to Vissel Kobe as assistant coach in 2013.

On 16 December 2014, he was named manager of Ehime FC. With him in charge, the team finished 2015 season on 5th place, reaching the play-offs for its first time ever. He left the club after the end of 2016 season.

On 29 November 2016, Kiyama was named manager of Montedio Yamagata. He led the team to the J1 entry playoff in 2019, losing to Tokushima Vortis in the 2nd round. He departed from the club on 11 December 2019.

On 19 December 2019, Kiyama was appointed the manager of Vegalta Sendai, the first J1 League side of this managerial career. On 18 December 2020, the club announced his departure at the end of the 2020 season.

On 28 September 2021, Kiyama returned to Gamba Osaka as a coach until the end of the season.

On 14 December 2021, he signed with Fagiano Okayama.

Club statistics

Managerial statistics

 Statistics including J1 and J2 leagues, The Emperor's Cup and the J.League Cup results.

References

External links
 
 

1972 births
Living people
University of Tsukuba alumni
Association football people from Hyōgo Prefecture
Japanese footballers
J1 League players
J2 League players
Japan Football League players
Gamba Osaka players
Hokkaido Consadole Sapporo players
Mito HollyHock players
Japanese football managers
J1 League managers
J2 League managers
Mito HollyHock managers
JEF United Chiba managers
Ehime FC managers
Montedio Yamagata managers
Vegalta Sendai managers
Fagiano Okayama managers
Association football defenders